Mandar may refer to:

 Mandar (given name), a masculine Indian given name
 Mandar (Vidhan Sabha constituency), a constituency of the Jharkhand Vidhan Sabha, Ranchi district, Jharkhand, India
 Mandar block, an administrative blocks of Ranchi district, Jharkhand state, India
 Mandar, Ranchi, village in Ranchi district, Jharkhand, India
 Mandar language, an Austronesian language spoken by the Mandar in West Sulawesi, Indonesia
 Mandar people, a population in the province of West Sulawesi, Indonesia

See also 

 Manda (disambiguation)
 Mandar Parvat, a small mountain in Banka district, Bhagalpur division, Bihar, India
 Mandara (disambiguation)
 Mandarabad or Mandar Abad, a village in Qazvin Province, Iran

Language and nationality disambiguation pages